Pat Bay Air was a charter float plane and airline flying from the Victoria Airport Water Aerodrome in Patricia Bay near the Victoria International Airport on Widgeon Drive in North Saanich, British Columbia, Canada, where its headquarters was located. Pat Bay Air was one of only two seaplane companies to be based out of the historic Patricia Bay Seaplane Base; the other is Ocean Air Floatplanes. The seaplane base has been in continuous operation since the Second World War. Pat Bay Air Ltd. was purchased by Sandpiper Air Seaplanes Ltd. in 2013. Sandpiper Air Seaplanes Ltd. officially ceased operations in Alberta and BC in March 2016.

Former fleet
de Havilland Canada DHC-2 Beaver
Cessna 172
Cessna 185

See also
 List of seaplane operators
 List of defunct airlines of Canada

References

Regional airlines of British Columbia
Transport in the Capital Regional District
Airlines established in 2005
2005 establishments in British Columbia
Defunct seaplane operators